Tania del Rio (born November 16) is an American cartoonist working mainly in comic books. She is a graduate of the Minneapolis College of Art and Design with a BFA in animation.

In 2003, Tania's manga entry, Lovesketch, was selected to appear in TOKYOPOP's Rising Stars of Manga anthology, volume 2. She worked for Archie Comics as the writer and artist of Sabrina, the Teenage Witch, a monthly comic that was given a shōjo manga makeover from 2004 to 2009. She has also occasionally worked on Archie's Sonic the Hedgehog comic as both writer and artist. In addition to her work at Archie, Tania has also written for Marvel (Spider-Man/Araña: The Hunter Revealed), and writes a monthly manga column for Popcultureshock.com called "Read This Way". She also has a webcomic, My Poorly Drawn Life, that she updates weekly.

In Fall, 2006, Tania's company, SteelRiver Studio, published a book through HarperCollins Publishers entitled Mangaka America, a gallery and tutorial book featuring emerging North American manga artists.

In November 2015, together with Will Staehle, she published "Warren the 13th and The All-Seeing Eye", an illustrated novel, the first of a trilogy that eventually included "Warren the 13th and the Whispering Woods", and "Warren the 13th and the Thirteen-Year Curse".

She now resides in Los Angeles. In her spare time, Tania enjoys reading manga, knitting and crocheting, play video games, as well as collaborating with her husband on their personal comic projects: Knit-Wits and Muerte.

References

External links
 
 My Poorly Drawn Life
 
 
 
 SteelRiver Studio
https://www.amazon.com/gp/bookseries/B01MSTVQG4/ref=dp_st_1683690907

American women cartoonists
American webcomic creators
Year of birth missing (living people)
Living people
American female comics artists
Female comics writers
American cartoonists
21st-century American women